In algebraic geometry, a Kuga fiber variety, introduced by , is a fiber space whose fibers are abelian varieties and whose base space is an arithmetic quotient of a Hermitian symmetric space.

References

Algebraic geometry
Abelian varieties